Manhattan Village is a neighborhood in Manhattan Beach, California, founded in 1985. It was the "last major parcel available for development" in the city

Its construction was said to signify "the passing of an era – the removal of oil tanks and the beginning of development of more than 100 acres of formerly bare ground." At that time the city had a population of 30,245. Early concepts had included "a graveyard, a regional wilderness park and a lake that could accommodate paddle boating and sailboating."

West of the 405 Freeway and east of Sepulveda Boulevard, the neighborhood adjoins Marine Avenue to the north and is south of Rosecrans Avenue. The first part to be developed was 37 acres on Sepulveda.

In earlier days, the petroleum-drilling area was part of Standard Oil's 186-acre "tank farm" which held oil used in steam engines and steamships, according to Richard J Miescke, vice president of the Southern Division of the Chevron Land & Development Co. "They built those reservoirs with mule teams back in the '20s," he said.

The development as announced in 1983 was to have 115 single-family, zero-lot line estate homes (priced from 295,000 to $415,000), 177 town houses and 223 court homes.

Chevron was to sell four acres of its property for about eighty units of affordable rental housing.

Property sales were halted in June 1985 because of methane vapors discovered at the 76-acre site. After tests, there were found to be "no significant problems," said Nester Acedera of the state's Department of Health Services, and sales were resumed. A temporary vapor-venting system was put in place.

Shopping center
Manhattan Village is also the name of a mixed-use retail and office center in the same city. Opened in 1982, the property spans some 44 acres and features several shopping, dining, and retail destinations. The property consists of enclosed retail space, a community center, and offices.

Manhattan Village Mall was built in 1982. Macy's opened in the former Bullock's space in 1996, along with the former Buffums. The property was remodeled in the 1990s and early 2000s.

In May 2004, the property was purchased by RREF, a private real estate fund owned by Deutsche Bank. In November of the following year, 3500 Sepulveda purchased the building with the same address, located near the northwest corner of the property.

JLL Remodel
In 2006, another remodel of the property was proposed. The proposal was heard by the city council several times until construction finally began in 2018 under real estate management company JLL. The remodel included a renovation of existing retail space (completed spring 2018), Macy's expansion (completed late 2018), new parking (completed late 2018), and new outdoor shopping area (completed 2019 and 2020).

See also
 Del Amo Fashion Center
 South Bay Galleria

References

Shopping malls in the South Bay, Los Angeles